"Let Your Hair Down" is a 1973  single by American vocal group The Temptations. The track appeared on the Temptations 1973 album, 1990.

Song Background
Dennis Edwards sings lead and the group is backed by Rose Royce for this track.

Chart performance 
Released as a single in November of that year, it reached the number one spot on the R&B Singles Chart in February 1974 (their last R&B #1 with collaborator Norman Whitfield) but was less successful on the Pop Singles Chart, stalling at #27.

Personnel
 Lead vocals by Dennis Edwards
 Background vocals by Richard Street, Damon Harris, Otis Williams and Melvin Franklin
 Instrumentation by Rose Royce
 Written and produced by Norman Whitfield

Cover Versions
Funk singer Yvonne Fair also recorded the song for her debut (and only) album, 1975's The Bitch is Black.

References

1973 singles
1974 singles
The Temptations songs
Songs written by Norman Whitfield
Song recordings produced by Norman Whitfield
1973 songs
Motown singles
Gordy Records singles